The Skid Row City Limit Mural is an  mural displayed on San Julian Street in Los Angeles, California. It features a map demarcating Skid Row's legally recognized boundaries alongside an official-looking sign, replete with city seal, reading "Skid Row City Limit, Population: Too Many." This is the initial installation of a mural project that will eventually cover the whole wall on the San Julian block just north of 6th Street (Closest address is 570 S San Julian St).

Installed in compliance with the city's mural ordinance, the project was created and organized by Skid Row community activist General Jeff Page for his Issues and Solutions organization, with mural installation led by local street art crew Winston Death Squad. It was carried out solely with volunteer labor from Skid Row citizens and without the aid of any non-profit service organizations. The piece represents a reaction to the growing practice among commercial groups of referring to historic areas of Skid Row with alternative designations. An adjacent companion piece titled "Skid Row Map" emphasizes Skid Row's historic and official significance with a citation of the 2006 Jones v. City of Los Angeles court decision that specifies Skid Row's physical boundaries as between Main and Alameda streets to the west and east, and Third and Seventh streets to the north and south. 

Los Angeles City Councilman José Huizar's office has hailed the mural, saying, "It's community pride on the one hand, it's cleverly done and it creates conversation and debate, which often great public art does." In its annual street art review, LA Weekly named the Skid Row City Limit mural the city's best new street art mural of 2014.

See also 
 Murals of Los Angeles

References

Downtown Los Angeles
Art in Greater Los Angeles
Murals in Los Angeles